Sarmaj castle is a historical castle located in Harsin County in Kermanshah Province, The longevity of this fortress dates back to the Sasanian Empire.

References 

Castles in Iran
Sasanian castles